Alen Martin Skribek (born 11 April 2001) is a Hungarian professional footballer who plays for Paks.

Club career
On 26 January 2023, Skribek signed a three-and-a-half-year contract with Paks.

International career
He was a squad member for the 2021 UEFA European Under-21 Championship.

Career statistics
.

References

External links

2001 births
Living people
Footballers from Budapest
Hungarian footballers
Hungary youth international footballers
Hungary under-21 international footballers
Association football forwards
Puskás Akadémia FC players
Puskás Akadémia FC II players
Csákvári TK players
Budafoki LC footballers
Zalaegerszegi TE players
Paksi FC players
Nemzeti Bajnokság I players
Nemzeti Bajnokság II players
Nemzeti Bajnokság III players